Jhon Andrés Córdoba Copete (born 11 May 1993) is a Colombian professional footballer who plays as a striker for Russian Premier League club Krasnodar. He is well known for his strength and his powerful shots. His skills and talents have led many to consider him to be a Colombian version of Didier Drogba due to their similar traits.

Club career

Envigado
A youth product of Envigado F.C., Córdoba made his professional debut for the club in 2010. In the 2011 Torneo Apertura, he appeared in only two matches, all from the bench. Córdoba was retained to play in the 2011 Copa Colombia, scoring against giants Independiente Medellin and Once Caldas. However, Envigado finished last in their group and were eliminated. 

Córdoba was included in the starting eleven for the 2011 Torneo Finalización. He then scored five goals in 18 appearances, and notably scoring a brace in a 2–3 loss to Once Caldas. Córdoba successfully defended his starting place in the following year's Torneo Apertura, and finished the season as the club's top goal scorer with six goals in 16 games.

Chiapas
Following an impressive season with Envigado, Córdoba was signed by Mexican club Querétaro and immediately loaned to fellow league team Chiapas on 9 July 2012. He made his debut on 20 July 2012 against Tigres UANL, and scored his first goal in a 4–0 triumph against San Luis.

Espanyol
On 2 September 2013, it was announced that Córdoba would join La Liga club RCD Espanyol. The deal would consist of a one-year loan with an option to buy for €3.5 million.

On 30 November, Córdoba scored his first goal in a 1–2 loss against Real Sociedad. On 25 January of the following year he scored his second goal in a match against Valencia CF, and finished the campaign with four goals.

Granada
On 12 August 2014 Córdoba signed a five-year deal with fellow league team Granada CF. He scored his first goal for the club a week later in a 1–0 win against Athletic Bilbao.

Mainz 05
On 31 August 2015, Córdoba was loaned to 1. FSV Mainz 05, for one year. He went on to score five Bundesliga goals including a game-winning goal against eventual champions Bayern Munich in a shock 2–1 win away from home. In May 2016, Mainz exercised their option to sign Córdoba permanently for a reported transfer fee of around €5 million with Córdoba signing a contract running until 2020.

In the 2016–17 season Córdoba made 29 appearances contributing 5 goals and assists each.

FC Köln

On 28 June 2017, 1. FC Köln announced that they had signed Córdoba on a four-year deal. The transfer paid to Mainz was reported as around €15 million.

On the 28 April 2018, he came off the bench as Köln lost 3–2 to SC Freiburg which confirmed Köln’s relegation from the Bundesliga.

In the 2018–19 season, Córdoba finished second in scoring with 20 goals in the 2. Bundesliga. Köln immediately gained promotion back to the 1. Bundesliga.

He scored in his fifth home match in a row and notched his first Bundesliga brace in a 3–1 victory over VfL Wolfsburg on 18 January 2020.

Hertha BSC
On 15 September 2020, Córdoba joined Hertha BSC on a four-year deal.

Krasnodar 
On 18 July 2021, Hertha BSC announced that they had reached an agreement with Russian Premier League club Krasnodar over the sale of Córdoba, pending contract signatures and a medical.

On 23 July 2021, Krasnodar announced the signing of a four-year contract with Córdoba. On 3 March 2022, following the Russian invasion of Ukraine, Krasnodar announced that his contract is suspended and he will not train with the team, but the contract is not terminated and remains valid. At the time, he was already removed from Krasnodar's league squad due to an injury. Córdoba returned to the club in June 2022.

International career

Youth

2013 South American Youth Championship
Córdoba was called up to the 2013 South American Youth Championship games to represent Colombia wearing the number 9 jersey.

He scored in the opening game against Paraguay in a 1–0 victory. In the game against Bolivia, he scored 2 goals in a 6–0 victory although he failed to score many good opportunities that were given to him. Thus, he was not selected in the final game of the group stage against Argentina where Colombia was already qualified to the next round.

Córdoba scored the winner against Uruguay in a 1–0 victory allowing Colombia to top their group. After winning the South American championship with Colombia, he scored a total of 4 goals contributing greatly for his nation.

2013 Toulon Tournament
Córdoba took part with the U20 side again for the 2013 Toulon Tournament, where he failed to score a single goal. Despite this, Colombia managed to become the runners-up in the tournament.

In a friendly against the U-20 side of France, Córdoba missed a penalty kick but managed to score a header in a 2–2.

2013 U-20 FIFA World Cup Turkey
In the opening match against Australia, Córdoba missed and wasted many chances while Colombia was trailing 1–0. However, he managed to finally score a goal in the 78th minute resulting in a 1–1 draw. In the last group match against El Salvador, Córdoba converted a successful penalty in a 3–0 victory.

Style of play
A 'powerful' striker, Córdoba's most noticeable traits give regard to his physical traits: tall and large with very powerful shots as his major most noticeable trademark. His speed and pace has been a major factor in most games that he plays. Due to his size, he carries natural talent with balls that come from the air. This style of play is well-known with Ivorian international Didier Drogba who Córdoba has been compared with on many occasions.

Personal life
Córdoba's father Manuel was also a professional football striker.

Career statistics

Club

Honours
FC Köln
2. Bundesliga: 2018–19

Colombia
South American Youth Championship: 2013

References

External links

1993 births
Sportspeople from Chocó Department
Living people
Colombian footballers
Colombia youth international footballers
Colombia under-20 international footballers
Association football forwards

Envigado F.C. players
Chiapas F.C. footballers
Querétaro F.C. footballers
Dorados de Sinaloa footballers
RCD Espanyol footballers
Granada CF footballers
1. FSV Mainz 05 players
1. FC Köln players
Hertha BSC players
FC Krasnodar players
Categoría Primera A players
Liga MX players
La Liga players
Bundesliga players
2. Bundesliga players
Russian Premier League players
Colombian expatriate footballers
Expatriate footballers in Mexico
Colombian expatriate sportspeople in Mexico
Expatriate footballers in Spain
Colombian expatriate sportspeople in Spain
Expatriate footballers in Germany
Colombian expatriate sportspeople in Germany
Expatriate footballers in Russia
Colombian expatriate sportspeople in Russia